In Search of Historic Jesus is a 1979 American documentary film based on Lee Roddy and Charles E. Sellier Jr.'s book of the same name. Released by Sunn Classic Pictures, the film speculates on the historical accuracy of the biblical depiction of Jesus.

Production notes
In Search of Historic Jesus was produced by Sunn Classic Pictures, a Utah-based independent film company that specialized in releasing low-budget family films and documentaries. Along with such features as In Search of Noah's Ark (1976) and Beyond and Back (1978), the film was one of a series of releases from the company that attempted to present convincing scientific evidence for Christian theology.

Parts of the film were shot in Heber, Provo, and Park City in Utah.

Reception
In Search of Historic Jesus was a massive commercial success. Produced on a low budget, the film earned over $22.4 million at the North American box office and was the 34th highest-grossing film of 1979.

See also
 Historical Jesus
 Historicity of Jesus
 Sources for the historicity of Jesus
 Historicity of the Bible

References

External links
 
 
 
 
 Watch In Search of Historic Jesus at the Internet Archive

Films shot in Utah
1979 documentary films
1979 films
Taft Entertainment Pictures films
1970s English-language films
Films directed by Henning Schellerup